Sue Bourne (born December 1953) is a Scottish television documentary producer and director. She founded and runs the independent production company Wellpark Productions, which has produced films including My Street, Fabulous Fashionistas, Mum and Me and Jig.

Early life and background
Bourne was born in December 1953 to Ethel (née McKenzie) and John Bourne. Her mother was a stay at home mum who later became the subject of one of her film Mum and Me, and her father was a civil servant. When she was one year old she moved with her family to Ayr, Scotland. She attended the University of Edinburgh and studied politics. Bourne's partner for 16 years was the Polish filmmaker Witold Starecki, who died in 2011. The couple had one child, Holly.

Filmography

 Exposure - Channel 4, Director 2000
Kiss N Sell - Channel 4, Cutting Edge, 2000
Perfect Breasts - Channel 4, Producer/Director, 2001
Bass Pass Bandits - Channel 4, Cutting Edge, Producer/Director, 2001
The Real Tony Blackburn - Channel 4, Producer/Director
Behind Closed Doors - Channel 4, Cutting Edge, Producer/Director, 2003 
Strike: When Britain Went to War - Channel 4, Executive Producer, 2003
Naked Britain - Channel 4, Producer/Director, 2004
Bosom Buddies - Channel 4, Only Human, Executive Producer, 2005
Wedding Days - Channel 4, Cutting Edge, Producer/Director, 2006
The Prince Charles Generation - Channel 4, Cutting Edge, Produced, 2008
The Red Lion - Channel 4, Cutting Edge, Producer/Director, 2009
Love, Life, Death In A Day - Channel 4, Cutting Edge, 2009
Wink, Meet, Delete - An Insider's Guide To Internet Dating' - BBC Scotland, Producer/Director, 2010
The Falling Man - Channel 4, Executive Producer, 2006
Mum and Me - One Life BBC1, Producer/Director, 2008; Winner - Best Documentary at the Celtic Media Film Festival, Winner - Mental Health Media "Making A Difference" Award
My Street - Channel 4, Cutting Edge Producer/Director, 2008
Jig - Producer/Director, Official Selection HOT DOCS 2011, Dinard Festival du Film, Busan Film Festival
Fabulous Fashionistas - Channel 4, Producer/Director, 2013
The Vikings Are Coming - BBC2, Producer/Director, 2015
The Age of Loneliness - BBC1, Producer/Director, 2016

Critical response
In 2013 Broadcast Magazine named her one of the top directors in the country with 'Fabulous Fashionistas' saying "a new Sue Bourne documentary always feels like a treat in the schedules... In classic Bourne style, a simple concept became a hook to explore the minutiae of everyday lives and the extraordinary stories of ordinary people, never shying away from the frightening aspects of mortality but ultimately celebrating the colorful lives of a group of women determined to accept and embrace the moment".

References

Living people
Alumni of the University of Edinburgh
Scottish film producers
Scottish women film directors
1953 births
Scottish documentary filmmakers
Women documentary filmmakers